The following lists events that happened during 1902 in New Zealand.

Incumbents

Regal and viceregal
Head of State – Edward VII
Governor – The Earl of Ranfurly GCMG

Government
The Liberal Party was re-elected and formed the 15th New Zealand Parliament.

Speaker of the House – Maurice O'Rorke
Prime Minister – Richard Seddon
Minister of Finance – Richard Seddon
Chief Justice – Sir Robert Stout

The number of members of the House of Representatives is increased from 74 to 80.

Parliamentary opposition
Leader of the Opposition – no recognised leader in 1902.

Main centre leaders
Mayor of Auckland – Alfred Kidd
Mayor of Wellington – John Aitken
Mayor of Christchurch – Arthur Rhodes then Henry Wigram
Mayor of Dunedin – George Denniston then James Park

Events 

 28 October – The SS Ventnor sinks off the coast of Hokianga with the loss of 13 lives. The ship was carrying the remains of 499 Chinese men, most of whom had been involved in the Otago Gold Rush, back to China.

Arts and literature

See 1902 in art, 1902 in literature

Music

See: 1902 in music

Sport

Boxing
The New Zealand Boxing Association is formed to control and promote amateur boxing. The first national championships are held, in four weight divisions, in Christchurch.

National amateur champions
Heavyweight – J. Fitzsimmons (Timaru)
Middleweight – F. Nash (Christchurch)
Lightweight – P. Oliver (Christchurch)
Featherweight – A. Jones (Christchurch)

Chess
National Champion: R.J. Barnes of Wellington.

Golf
The 10th National Amateur Championships were held in Christchurch
 Men: S.H. Gollan (Napier)
 Women: Mrs ? Bidwell

Horse racing

Harness racing
 Auckland Trotting Cup: Van Dieman

Rugby
 The NZRFU decides upon a challenge format for the Ranfurly Cup competition. When the trophy arrives from Britain it turns out to in fact be a shield.
 13 September – The Ranfurly Shield is first awarded to Auckland in recognition of their unbeaten record for the season.

Soccer
Provincial league champions:
	Auckland:	North Shore
	Otago:	Roslyn Dunedin
	Wellington:	Wellington St. John's

Births
 1 May: Geoffrey Michael William Hodgkins, naturalist.
 8 May: Curly Page, cricketer.
 13 June: Gordon Minhinnick, cartoonist.
 16 June: Clarence Beeby, educationalist.
 3 July: Jack Newman, cricketer.
 23 July: Arthur Lindo Patterson, physicist.
 8 September: Bryan Todd, businessman.
 Fred Hackett, politician.
 (in Paris): Louise Henderson, painter.
 Trevor Henry, supreme court judge.

Deaths
 30 January: Alfred Renall, politician and mayor.
 27 February:  James Gordon Stuart Grant, a local eccentric in Dunedin.
 26 June: William Garden Cowie, Bishop of Auckland and Anglican Primate of New Zealand
 15 July: John McLean, politician and farmer.
 18 October: Theodore Haultain, politician.
 3 December: Robert Lawson, architect

See also
List of years in New Zealand
Timeline of New Zealand history
History of New Zealand
Military history of New Zealand
Timeline of the New Zealand environment
Timeline of New Zealand's links with Antarctica

References

External links